Obey is a collaboration album between American rappers Blanco and The Jacka, released on October 16, 2012. It includes guest appearances from Freeway, Mistah F.A.B., Ampichino & Messy Marv, among others. The cover art for Obey is a tribute to the painting Andre the Giant Has a Posse. Music videos have been filmed for "Submit" featuring Freeway and "This Is Your God" featuring Ampichino & Messy Marv.

Track listing

References

External links
AllMusic review

Collaborative albums
2012 albums
The Jacka albums